Psychodidae, called drain flies, sink flies, filter flies, sewer flies, or sewer gnats, is a family of true flies. Some genera have short, hairy bodies and wings giving them a "furry" moth-like appearance, hence one of their common names, moth flies. Members of the sub-family Phlebotominae which are hematophagous (feed on blood) may be called sand flies in some countries, although this term is also used for other unrelated flies.

There are more than 2,600 described species worldwide, most of them native to the humid tropics. This makes them one of the most diverse families of their order. Drain flies sometimes inhabit plumbing drains and sewage systems, where they are harmless, but may be a persistent annoyance.

Life cycle

The larvae of the subfamilies Psychodinae, Sycoracinae and Horaiellinae live in aquatic to semi-terrestrial or sludge-based habitats, including bathroom sinks, where they feed on bacteria and can become problematic. The larvae of the most commonly encountered species are nearly transparent with a non-retractable black head and can sometimes be seen moving along the moist edges of crevices in shower stalls or bathtubs or submerged in toilet water. The body lacks prolegs, but the body segments are divided into a series of rings called annuli (singular is annulus). Some of these rings will have characteristic plates on the dorsal side. The larval thorax is not significantly larger than its abdomen, giving it a more "worm-like" appearance than that of most aquatic insect larvae.

In some species, the larvae can secure themselves to surfaces of their environment using "attachment disks" on their ventral side. Like mosquito larvae, they cannot absorb oxygen through water, and instead breathe via a small dark tube (a spiracle) on their posterior end — they must regularly reach the surface to obtain oxygen.  The larval stage lasts for between 9 and 15 days, depending on species, temperature, and environment.  There are four instar stages.
In small numbers, the larvae are sometimes considered beneficial, as their strong jaws can cut through the hair and sludge waste in drains which might otherwise form clogs.  However, unless this sludge layer is removed entirely, the adult flies will continue to find it and lay more eggs.

While the biting midges also have larvae that have no prolegs and which also have attachment disks, the larvae of the netwinged midges can be distinguished from those of the moth fly by the multiple deep lateral constrictions of the latter.

The pupal stage lasts between 20 and 40 hours.  During this stage, the insect does not feed, but stays submerged near the water surface, still breathing through a spiracle, and soon metamorphoses into an adult fly, which bursts through a seam in the pupal casing and emerges onto the water's surface.

The adults are half as long as the larvae, but are much broader in appearance, with a pair of hairy wings held pitched-roof-like over the body.  The wings have the most elementary venation of any of the Diptera, having little more than a series of parallel veins without crossveins.

The adults are typically nocturnal, though they orient themselves around lights and may appear to be attracted to light and odors. They are erratic fliers, and are often seen walking or running rapidly as well as taking flight. They are most active at night, but may also be seen during daylight, or near windows, lights, or illuminated display panels.

The adults live for about 20 days, during which they will breed only once, often within hours of emerging from their pupal casings.  Females will lay their eggs (between 30 and 100) just above the water line inside moist drains.  Within 48 hours these eggs hatch into drain worms, the larval form.

Health effects 
The drain flies which are commonly found in bathrooms, Clogmia albipunctata, are not known to carry any human diseases, but have been known to be an opportunistic agent of myiasis. However, the subfamily of Phlebotominae does feed on blood with the ability to transmit (tropical) diseases, and Sycorax silacea can transmit microfilaria. Inhalation of insect fragments may cause respiratory asthma.

Taxonomy 

This family has seven subfamilies that contain more than 2600 described species.

Horaiellinae  Enderlein, 1937
Horaiella Tonnoir, 1933
Protohoraiella Curler, Krzeminski & Skibinska, 2019 Burmese amber, Myanmar Late Cretaceous (Cenomanian) 
Bruchomyiinae  Alexander, 1921 - selected genera:
Alexanderia Wagner & Kvifte, 2018 (Oriental)
Boreofairchildia Wagner & Stuckenberg, 2016 (Americas)
Bruchomyia Alexander, 1921 (South America):
Eutonnoiria Alexander, 1940 (Central Africa)
Laurenceomyia Wagner & Stuckenberg, 2016 (South America)
Nemopalpus Macquart, 1838
Notofairchildia Wagner & Stuckenberg, 2016
Hoffeinsodes Wagner, 2017 Baltic amber, Eocene
Palaeoglaesum Wagner, 2017 Burmese amber, Myanmar
Phlebotominae  Rondani, 1840
Australophlebotomus Theodor, 1948
Bichromomyia Artemiev, 1991
Brumptomyia França & Parrot, 1921 (Mexico to South America)
Chinius Leng, 1985 (2 species: China, Thailand)
Dampfomyia Addis, 1945
Datzia Stebner et al., 2015 (Burmese amber, Cenomanian)
Deanemyia Galati, 1995
Evandromyia Mangabeira, 1941
Edentomyia Galati, Andrade-Filho, da Silva & Falcão, 2003 (Brazil)
Expapillata Galati, 1995
Hertigia Fairchild, 1949
Idiophlebotomus Quate & Fairchild, 1961
Libanophlebotomus Azar et al., 1999 Lebanese amber Early Cretaceous (Barremian)
Lutzomyia França, 1924 (North and South America)
Mandalayia Stebner et al., 2015 (Burmese amber, Cenomanian)
Martinsmyia Galati, 1995
Mesophlebotomites Azar et al., 1999 Lebanese amber, Barremian
Micropygomyia Barretto, 1962
Migonemyia Galati, 1995
Nyssomyia Barretto, 1962
Oligodontomyia Galati, 1995
Palaeomyia Poinar 2004 Burmese amber, Albian 
Phlebotomites Stebner et al., 2015 Lebanese amber, Barremian, Burmese amber, Cenomanian
Phlebotoiella Solórzano Kraemer and Wagner 2009 Cambay amber, India, Eocene
Phlebotomus Rondani& Berté, 1840 (Europe, Africa, Asia, Australia)
Pintomyia Costa Lima, 1932
Pressatia Mangabeira, 1942
Protopsychodinae Stebner et al., 2015
Protopsychoda Azar et al., 1999 Lebanese amber, Barremian
Psathyromyia Barretto, 1962
Psychodopygus Mangabeira, 1941
Sciopemyia Barretto, 1962
Sergentomyia França & Parrot, 1920 (Europe, Africa, Asia, Australia)
Trichophoromyia Barretto, 1962
Viannamyia Mangabeira, 1941
Warileya Hertig, 1948 (Central and South America)
Protopsychodinae Stebner et al., 2015
Datzia Stebner et al., 2015 (Burmese amber, Cenomanian)
Mandalayia Stebner et al., 2015 (Burmese amber, Cenomanian)
Protopsychoda Azar et al., 1999 Lebanese amber, Barremian
Psychodinae Newman, 1834
Abcharis Tkoc and Jezek, 2013 (= Notiocharis Eaton, 1913, preoccupied) (Australia)
Alloeodidicrum Duckhouse, 1990 (Australia)
Arisemus Satchell, 1955
Atrichobrunettia Satchell, 1953
Australopericoma Vaillant, 1975
Balbagathis Quate, 1996
Bazarella Vaillant, 1961
Berdeniella Vaillant, 1976
Boreoclytocerus Duckhouse, 1978
Breviscapus Quate, 1955
Brunettia Annandale, 1910
Clogmia Enderlein, 1937
Clytocerus Eaton, 1904
Didicrum Enderlein, 1937
Epacretron Quate, 1965
Eremolobulosa Duckhouse, 1990 (Australia)
Eurygarka Quate, 1959
Feuerborniella Vaillant, 1974
Gerobrunettia Quate & Quate, 1967
Lepimormia Enderlein, 1937
Lepidiella Enderlein, 1937
Lobulosa Szabo, 1960
Maruina Müller, 1895 (Americas)
Matuna Stebner and Solórzano Kraemer 2014 Mexican amber, Miocene
Megapsychoda Azar and Nel 2002 Crato Formation, Brazil, Early Cretaceous (Aptian)
Mormia Enderlein, 1937
Neoarisemus Botosaneanu & Vaillant, 1970
Paleopsychoda Azar et al., 1999 Lebanese amber, Barremian, Jordanian amber, Albian, Taimyr amber, Russia, Albian
Panimerus Eaton, 1913
Paralibanopsychoda Azar and Nel 2002 Lebanese amber, Barremian
Paramormia Enderlein, 1937
Parasetomima Duckhouse, 1968 (South America)
Paratelmatoscopus Satchell, 1953 (Australia)
Pericoma Haliday, in Walker, 1856
Peripsychoda Enderlein, 1937
Philosepedon Eaton, 1904 (Europe, North and Central America)
Pneumia Enderlein, 1937 (= Satchelliella Vaillant, 1979)
Psychoda Latreille, 1796
Rotundopteryx Duckhouse, 1990 (Australia)
Saraiella Vaillant, 1981
Setomima Enderlein, 1937
Stupkaiella Vaillant, 1973
Succinarisemus Wagner, 2002 Mexican amber, Dominican amber, Miocene
Szaboiella Vaillant, 1979
Telmatoscopus Eaton, 1904
Thornburghiella Vaillant, 1982
Threticus Eaton, 1904
Tinearia  Schellenberg, 1803
Tonnoiriella Vaillant, 1982
Trichopsychoda Tonnoir, 1922
Ulomyia Walker, 1856 (= Saccopterix Haliday, in Curtis, 1839, preoccupied)
Vaillantodes Wagner, 2002 ( = Vaillantia Wagner, 1993, preoccupied)
Wightipsychoda Azar 2019 Bembridge Marls, United Kingdom, Priabonian
Sycoracinae Jung, 1954
Aposycorax Duckhouse, 1972
Palaeoparasycorax Stebner et al., 2015 (Burmese amber, Cenomanian)
Parasycorax Duckhouse, 1972
Sycorax Haliday, in Curtis, 1839
Trichomyiinae Tonnoir, 1922
Axenotrichomyia Azar et al., 2015 Burmese amber, Cenomanian
Eatonisca Meunier, 1905 Baltic, Bitterfeld amber, Eocene
Eotrichomyia Meunier Oise amber, France Eocene (Ypresian)
Trichomyia Haliday, in Curtis, 1839
Xenotrichomyia Azar et al., 2015 New Jersey amber, Late Cretaceous (Turonian)
Incertae sedis
Bamara Stebner et al., 2015 Burmese amber, Cenomanian
Cretapsychoda Azar et al., 1999 Lebanese amber, Barremian
Eochaoborites Hong, 2002 Fushun amber, China, Ypresian
Eophlebotomus Cockerell, 1920 Lebanese amber, Barremian, Charentese amber, France, Cenomanian, Burmese amber, Cenomanian
Liassopsychodina Ansorge, 1994 Green Series, Germany, Early Jurassic (Toarcian)
Libanopsychoda Azar et al., 1999 Lebanese amber, Barremian
Mesopsychoda Brauer et al., 1889 Cheremkhovskaya Formation, Russia, Toarcian
Protopsychoda Azar et al., 1999 Lebanese amber, Barremian
Tanypsycha Ansorge, 1994 Green Series, Germany, Toarcian
Triassopsychoda Blagoderov and Grimaldi. 2007 Cow Branch Formation, North Carolina, Late Triassic (Norian)
Xenopsychoda Azar and Ziadé, 2005 Lebanese amber, Barremian

See also
 Fungus gnat
 Trichomyia lengleti

References

Further reading
 Quate, L.W. & B.V. Brown (2004). "Revision of Neotropical Setomimini (Diptera: Psychodidae: Psychodinae)". Contributions in Science, 500: 1–117. BioStor. .
 Vaillant, F. (1971). "Psychodidae–Psychodinae". In: E. Lindner, ed. Die Fliegen der Paläarktischen Region, 9d, Lieferung 287: 1–48.
 Young, D.G. & P.V. Perkins (1984). "Phlebotomine sand flies of North America (Diptera: Psychodidae)". Mosquito News, 44: 263–304.

External links

 Wing venation
 Ohio State University Extension
 Diptera.info Gallery
 Waarneming Gallery

 
Nematocera families
Taxa named by Edward Newman